Rural Free Delivery is an EP by the alternative country band Whiskeytown, released by Mood Food Records in 1997.  It compiles the four songs from the band's debut EP Angels recorded in a single day, with four additional outtakes from the same session. The music was recorded in 1995, just a few months after Whiskeytown formed, but it was released only two years later.  This was part of a deal worked out with Mood Food to release the band from their current contract so that they could sign with Outpost Recordings.

The EP contains a hidden track, an alternate mix of "Nervous Breakdown", at the beginning of the CD. To access it, listeners must scan backwards 3:15 from the beginning of the first listed track.

Track listing

Personnel and production credits
 Ryan Adams — guitar, vocals
 Caitlin Cary — violin, vocals
 Skillet Gilmore — drums
 Steve Grothman — bass
 Phil Wandscher — guitar, harmonica, vocals
 Jennifer Thomas — design
 Kurt Underhill, Toby Roan — photos
Recorded at Sonic Wave Studios, Raleigh, NC by Greg Elkins
Mixed at Sonic Wave Studios, Raleigh, NC by Mark Cimerro & Kurt Underhill
Mastered at The Kitchen, Chapel Hill, NC by Brent Lambert

References

Whiskeytown EPs
1997 EPs